The 1977–78 Cuban National Series was a watershed in that it coincided with Cuba's administrative restructuring of 1977, which created fourteen provinces. Pinar del Río's Vegueros won the title, with a slim victory over Havana's Industriales.

Restructuring
Teams were renamed along these lines, many taking the names of their new locations.

Three provinces kept two teams:
Havana (city): Industriales and Metropolitanos
Pinar del Río Province: Vegueros and Forestales
Matanzas Province: Citricultores and Henequeneros

Additionally, the special administrative area of Isla de la Juventud had its own team, despite not being a province.

This league structure survives today in a similar form.

The 1977-78 season was also the first in which aluminum bats were used league-wide replacing the wooden bats, and was also the first in which the designated hitter was used, replacing the pitcher's turn at bat, following an off-season decision by the Baseball Federation of Cuba and by the National Sports Institution, following the lead of the American League of Major League Baseball 4 years before.

Standings

References

 (Note - text is printed in a white font on a white background, depending on browser used.)

Cuban National Series seasons
Base
Base
1978 in baseball